The Robba Fountain, since the first half of the 20th century also known as the Fountain of the Three Carniolan Rivers, is the fountain that stands in front of Ljubljana Town Hall at Town Square in Ljubljana, the capital of Slovenia. It was originally made in 1751 by the Italian sculptor Francesco Robba and is one of the city's most recognisable symbols.

History

The fountain was commissioned to Francesco Robba in 1743, but was unveiled only in 1751. In its creation, Robba was inspired by Bernini's Fontana dei Quattro Fiumi (Fountain of the Four Rivers) at Piazza Navona during a visit to Rome, but he modelled it after Fontana del Pantheon, the fountain by Filippo Barigioni at Piazza della Rotonda. In 2006, the original fountain was renovated and moved into the National Gallery, whereas at Town Square it has been replaced by a replica.

Description
The fountain consists of three male figures with jugs, which came several years after the fountain's creation to supposedly represent the gods of the three rivers of Carniola: the Ljubljanica, Sava and Krka, and later as well the three territorial units of Carniola: Upper Carniola, Lower Carniola, and Inner Carniola. Steps that lead up to the fountain represent the Carniolan mountains. The water pool has a shape of a shell. In the center of the fountain stands a  obelisk. The sculptural part of the fountain is made of Carrara marble, the obelisk is made of the local Lesno Brdo marble and the pool is made of local Podpeč limestone.

Cultural significance
After Slovenia declared independence from Yugoslavia, the Robba Fountain was portrayed by Rudi Španzel on the 5,000 Slovenian tolar banknote. It was in circulation from December 1993 until the introduction of the euro in January 2007. Since 2001, the fountain has been protected as a cultural monument of national significance.

References

External links

Buildings and structures in Ljubljana
Buildings and structures completed in 1751
Fountains in Slovenia
Center District, Ljubljana
Cultural monuments of Slovenia
Baroque architecture in Slovenia
Baroque sculptures